Hanazono Kintetsu Liners rugby team are a Japanese rugby union team owned by Kintetsu Corporation which was founded in 1929. They have won the All-Japan Championship three times as an amateur team. Their home is at Hanazono Rugby Stadium in Higashiosaka, Japan, which was also opened in 1929.

Early in 2008 Kintetsu won promotion back to the Top League for the 2008-9 season, and it was announced that former All Blacks coach Peter Sloane would be head coach.  After 3 years with Peter Sloane, Ryusuke Maeda become head coach in 2011.

The team rebranded as Hanazono Kintetsu Liners ahead of the rebranding of the Top League to the Japan Rugby League One in 2022.

Honours
 All-Japan Championship 
 Champions: 1966, 1967, 1974
 Runner-up: 1961(NHK Cup), 1963
 Company Championship 
 Champions: 1953, 1956, 1957, 1961, 1966, 1967, 1969, 1974
 Runner-up: 1948, 1951, 1955, 1958, 1959, 1960, 1963, 1965, 1973

History

Early Periods
In 1927, this team was founded by some employees of Osaka Denki Kido (called “Daiki”).  And the team was confirmed as a company’s official sport club by the company in 1929.  In the same year, Hanazono Rugby Stadium was founded by the company.

Before and during the World War II, there was no national tournament, which is well-organized to cover all company rugby teams in Japan.  But they won the Osaka Company Rugby Tournament in 1936, and runner-up for three times.

After the World War II, the company name was changed to Kinki Nippon Railway (called “Kintetsu”).  And the team was reformed in April 1946.  Some members could come back to the team, but some of them could not come back from the war.

At that time, Heinai Tsuge joined the team.  He was a player of Sentetsu(Chosen Government Railway) Rugby Club, who had been a leading team in the company rugby scene in the 1930s.  Tsuge became a head coach and also a player in Kintetsu, and the team had grown up.

In 1947, they won the qualifying round of western Japan for the National Sports Festival of Japan (only 4 teams were qualified from over Japan, i.e. northern, eastern and western Japan plus Kyushu), and participated in the final rounds.

In 1948–1949 season, they also participated in the first national Company Rugby Football Championship, which consists of 4 teams from all over Japan.  And won the runner-up.

Glorious 50s - 70s
In 1953–1954 season, they won the Company Championship for the first time.  Including this first win, they won this title for 8 times and the runner-up for 9 times from 1948 to 1975.

Especially, they won the title in 1956–1957 season without allowing any score to all opponents in all four matches.  This was called “shut-out champion”, and this record is not broken in any major rugby championships in Japan yet.

In March 1959, Kintetsu defeated British Columbia from Canada at a score of 16-9.  This British Columbia team was called “Canadian national team” at that time in Japan.  They had 8 games in Japan, and they lost only one game which was against Kintetsu.

In 1960–1961 season, the first NHK Cup was held, which decides the No. 1 rugby club in Japan.  Before that, university teams had been stronger than company teams in Japan.  But after the World War II, many company teams were restarted or founded newly, and the company rugby were growing up.  So Japan Rugby Football Union organized the NHK cup for three times from this season, and changed it to All-Japan Rugby Football Championship from 1963–1964 season.

Kintetsu became runner-up in the NHK cup 1961-62.  And they won the All-Japan Championship for 3 times (1966–67, 67-68, 74-75) and runner-up for 1 time (1963–64).

Yoshihiro Sakata had been playing for Kintetsu and Japan national team in those periods, and later, he enters the World Rugby Hall of Fame in 2012.

In 1969–1970 season, Kintetsu won the Company Championship and got the right to participate in the seventh All-Japan Championship.  But they declined to participate in the All-Japan Championship, because its schedule was overlapped with the second Asian Championship in Bangkok and almost half of Japanese national players were Kintetsu players.

The Company Championship had been knock-out system competition, and was developed to Japan Rugby Top League(JRTL) in 2003.  But a nationwide round-robbin competition for the company rugby did not exist in Japan till the establishment of the Top League.  Before the establishment of the Top League, regional leagues were held in several regions of Japan by round robbin system.

Kiuntetsu was belonging to Kansai (western Japan) Company Rugby Football League (called Kansai Shakaijin League), which was started in 1958.  They were honoured the continuous 11 championships from the first to the eleventh Kansai Shalaijin League (from 1958 to 1969).  Totally they won 17 times in this league.  This Kansai Shalaijin League was finished in 2002, and “Top West League” was started in 2003 as a subsidiary league of the Top League.

In 1974–1975 season, Kintetsu won the All-Japan Championship, and then notable national players such as Yoshihiro Sakata and Hiroshi Ogsasawara retired.  Further, Ryozo Imazato and Susumu Hara also retired after the 1976–1977 season.  Due to the retirement of these national players, it was getting hard for Kintetsu to win the title.

In 1977–1978 and 1988–1989 seasons, they won the Kansai Shakaijin League.  But they won no title in the Company Championship in these periods.

Top League and Top West
In 2003–2004 season, the Top League was established by absorbing the Company Championship, and Kintetsu was selected as original member of the league.  The nickname became “Liners”, because the company is railway corporation and their rapid express train, “Kintetsu Urban Liner” was famous.

In the first season of the Top League, Kintetsu finished at 10th place in 12 teams, and remained in the league by defeating Kyuden Voltex at the relegation match.  But, in the next season (2004–05), they finished at 11th place, and fell down to the lower category, the Top West League, automatically.

Kintetsu Corporation had been defining their rugby team as just amateur sports club without any “shamateurism”, and so the players must work full-time at the company without any advantage by playing rugby.  Further, when they play rugby and travel for rugby, Kintetsu Corporation did not pay for their absence of work.  This policy was also applied to Japan national players of Kintetsu, who traveled abroad for matches such as World Cup.  So, such Kintetsu players had to go abroad for rugby tour without getting any salary for some months, though other company players received salary for those periods as “business trip”.

But after the falling down to the Top West League in 2005, Kintetsu decided to re-organize the Liners as semi-professional, like other teams.  And also, they started to hire famous full-time professional players, like other teams.

After three years in the Top West League, Kintetsu returned to the Top League in 2008.  And Peter Sloane became a head coach in 2008 with three-year contract.  Now they are keeping the middle place of the Top League.

Recently Kintetsu also signed international players such as Leon MacDonald in 2009, Rico Gear in 2010, Andre Taylor in 2014, Pierre Spies and Damian de Allende in 2015.

Then-Rebels & former Reds & Australian test halves pairing Quade Cooper & Will Genia signed for 2019-2020, with Cooper joining following the conclusion of the 2019 Super Rugby season having been omitted by coach Michael Cheika from the Wallabies World Cup squad, while Genia joined following Australia's exit in the quarter final against eventual finalists, England.
Coincidentally, Kintetsu signed an agreement with their former club in 2020, becoming a major partner, appearing as their major sponsor for the Rebels on their away kit. With both clubs allowing access to each other's players for training & coaching experience.

Current squad

The Hanazono Kintetsu Liners squad for the 2023 season is:

References

External links
 Kintetsu Liners - official home page

Japan Rugby League One teams
Rugby in Kansai
Rugby clubs established in 1929
Sports teams in Osaka Prefecture
1929 establishments in Japan
Kintetsu Group Holdings